Nothing to Fear is the second studio album by American new wave band Oingo Boingo, released in 1982 on A&M Records.

Music
Nothing to Fear possesses a more hard-edged sound than the band's previous releases, featuring louder electric guitar and percussion, an increased and more varied use of synthesizers and the introduction of sequencers on some tracks. The songs also feature an unorthodox range of instruments, some of which were designed and built by the band.

The original 3:47 mix of the song "Private Life" was replaced on later vinyl pressings and CD issues by the 3:18 single mix. The original mix features more prominent bass guitar and xylophone, with a repeat of some verses and longer intro. The song's release was accompanied by a music video, directed by Danny Elfman's brother Richard Elfman, founder of the Mystic Knights of the Oingo Boingo.

In April 2020, Danny Elfman recorded a new solo version of "Running on a Treadmill", uploaded to his official website and Instagram page. It was recorded in self-quarantine during the COVID-19 pandemic and featured an accompanying video filmed by his daughter, Mali Elfman. At the time, it was only one of two Oingo Boingo songs Elfman had publicly performed since the band broke up in 1995. Elfman later recorded a new version of "Insects" for his 2021 album, Big Mess.

Reception
Despite continuous condemnation from critics, Nothing to Fear received high regional sales and radio airplay at the time of its release, selling 125,000 copies in its original run. 

Trouser Press writer Ira A. Robbins opined that Nothing to Fear was "more likable" than its predecessor, Only a Lad, but still sounded "phony", calling it a "derivative disappointment."  

Elfman often used the negativity of critics to the band's advantage through publicity, stating: "The music [the critics] like is inspirationless and contrived. If we start getting praise from this clique of six or eight reviewers, we'd probably have to evaluate where we went astray."

Following the album's release, the band went on a successful tour opening for bands such as the Police and Fear. The song "Wild Sex (in the Working Class)" was later featured in the John Hughes film Sixteen Candles (1984).

Reissue
In 2021, Rubellan Remasters issued a remastered version of Nothing to Fear on both colored vinyl and CD, the latter as an expanded edition with two bonus tracks. Both versions reinstated the original full-length version of "Private Life" into the album's running order.

Track listing

2021 CD bonus tracks

Personnel

Oingo Boingo
 Danny Elfman – lead vocals, rhythm guitar
 Steve Bartek – lead guitar, vocals
 Richard Gibbs – keyboards, synthesizers, vocals
 Kerry Hatch – bass, vocals
 Johnny "Vatos" Hernandez – drums
 Sam "Sluggo" Phipps – tenor saxophone, soprano saxophone
 Leon Schneiderman – baritone saxophone, alto saxophone
 Dale Turner – trumpet, trombone
 The inner sleeve notes from Nothing to Fear state: "All the boys bang things: Rumba-phones, original instruments designed and built by Leon Schneiderman."

Technical
 Oingo Boingo – co-producers
 Joe Chiccarelli – co-producer, engineer
 Krohn McHenry – second engineer (recording)
 Laura Engel – production assistant
 Mitch Gibson – second engineer (mixing)
 Steve Bartek – horn arrangements
 Charlie Unkeless – production manager
 Georganne Deen – front cover (from the Lou & Pearl Beach collection)
 Jules Bates – back cover and sleeve, art direction (Artrouble)

References 

1982 albums
A&M Records albums
Oingo Boingo albums
Albums produced by Joe Chiccarelli